The 2013 World Judo Cadets Championships is an edition of the World Judo Cadets Championships, organised by the International Judo Federation. It was held in Miami, United States from 8 to 11 August 2013.

Medal summary

Medal table

Men's events

Women's events

Source Results

References

External links
 

World Judo Cadets Championships
 U18
World Championships, U18
Judo
Judo competitions in the United States
Judo
Judo, World Championships U18